The Australian cricket team toured Sri Lanka in June and July 2022 to play two Tests, five One Day Internationals (ODIs) and three Twenty20 International (T20Is) matches. The Test series formed part of the 2021–2023 ICC World Test Championship. Both cricket boards confirmed the fixtures for the tour in March 2022.

Australia won the opening T20I match by ten wickets, with Aaron Finch and David Warner making an unbeaten 134-run partnership. Australia won the second T20I by three wickets to win the series with a match to play. Sri Lanka won the third T20I by four wickets, after an unbeaten half century from their captain Dasun Shanaka, with Australia winning the series 2–1.

In the ODI series, Australia won the opening match by two wickets, with Glenn Maxwell making an unbeaten 80 from 51 balls. Sri Lanka won the second ODI by 26 runs, following a batting collapse by Australia, to level the series. Sri Lanka won the third ODI by six wickets, after Australia had scored 291/6, with Pathum Nissanka scoring his first century in the format. It was Sri Lanka's highest successful run chase at the R. Premadasa Stadium, and their highest successful run chase against Australia in ODI cricket. Sri Lanka won the fourth match by four runs to win their first ODI bilateral series at home against Australia since 1992. Australia won the fifth and final ODI by four wickets, with Sri Lanka winning the series 3–2.

In the second innings of the first Test, Sri Lanka were bowled out inside one session, being dismissed for 113 runs in 22.5 overs. Needing only five runs for victory, David Warner hit the winning runs from four balls, with Australia winning the Test by ten wickets before the lunch break on the third day. Sri Lanka won the second Test by an innings and 39 runs to draw the series 1–1. It was the first time that Sri Lanka had beaten Australia by an innings in a Test match. Dinesh Chandimal scored his first double century in a Test match with 206 not out, and Prabath Jayasuriya took the best bowling figures for a Sri Lanka player on debut, with 12 for 177.

Squads

Sri Lanka also named Jeffrey Vandersay and Niroshan Dickwella as reserves for the T20I series. Kasun Rajitha and Matheesha Pathirana were both ruled out of Sri Lanka's squad for the final T20I match, with Asitha Fernando and Pramod Madushan named as their replacements. Wanindu Hasaranga was ruled out of Sri Lanka's ODI squad for the second match after suffering a groin injury. Sri Lanka also named Dunith Wellalage and Lakshitha Rasanjana as reserves in their Test squad. Praveen Jayawickrama was ruled out of Sri Lanka's squad for the second Test after he tested positive for COVID-19. On the day before the second Test, Dhananjaya de Silva, Asitha Fernando and Jeffrey Vandersay were also ruled out of the match after testing positive for COVID-19. Sri Lanka added Prabath Jayasuriya, Lakshitha Manasinghe, Maheesh Theekshana and Dunith Wellalage to their squad for the second Test.

Australia's Sean Abbott was ruled out of their T20I squad after breaking a finger in the nets. Mitchell Starc suffered a hand injury during the first T20I match, which ruled him out of the white-ball matches. Jhye Richardson was added to Australia's ODI squad as cover for Starc. Mitchell Marsh was ruled out of Australia's squad for the final T20I match with a calf strain, with Kane Richardson added to their ODI squad as cover. Marcus Stoinis suffered a side strain during the first ODI match, and was ruled out of the rest of the series. As a result, Matthew Kuhnemann and Travis Head were added to Australia's ODI squad. However, Travis Head was ruled out of the fifth and final ODI match due to a hamstring injury. As a result of Head's injury, Glenn Maxwell was added to Australia's Test squad. Ashton Agar was ruled out of Australia's squad for the second Test with Jon Holland named as his replacement.

Tour matches
For the tour to Sri Lanka, Cricket Australia also named a squad for the Australia A team, with two one-day matches and two first-class matches being played.

T20I series

1st T20I

2nd T20I

3rd T20I

ODI series

1st ODI

2nd ODI

3rd ODI

4th ODI

5th ODI

Test series

1st Test

2nd Test

Statistics

Most runs (T20I)

Most runs (ODI)

Most runs (Test)

Most wickets (T20I)

Most wickets (ODI)

Most wickets (Test)

2022 Asia Cup 

2022 ICC Men's T20 World Cup 

Afghan cricket team in Sri Lanka in 2022-23

Notes

References

External links
 Series home at ESPN Cricinfo
 A Series home at ESPN Cricinfo

2022 in Australian cricket
2022 in Sri Lankan cricket
International cricket competitions in 2022
Australian cricket tours of Sri Lanka